The Nokia 6700 classic is a mobile phone made by Nokia and successor of the 6300 and 6500 classic. It was announced in January 2009 and arrived on the European market in June that year. It has a stainless steel body and a chrome-covered keypad.

Features 
The Nokia 6700 classic is a Series 40 6th Edition phone. Among its key features are 
 Integrated A-GPS navigation with included maps software,
 5.0-megapixel camera with LED flash,
 WebKit Open Source Browser,
 Flash Lite 3.0,
 Bluetooth 2.1 + EDR
 MIDP Java 2.1 with additional Java APIs.

Supported WCDMA frequencies depend on the region where the device is available. It is a 3G WCDMA (2100/1900/900 MHz) phone but also supports quad-band GSM (1900/1800/900/850 MHz). It has a stainless steel body and a weight of 113 grams.

Note that the 6700 classic is quite different from the Nokia 6700 slide, which is based on the higher powered Symbian-based Series 60 operating system.

References

http://www.nokia.com/gb-en/products/phone/6700-classic/specifications/

External links 
 Nokia 6700 classic

6700 classic